Bismole is a theoretical heterocyclic organic compound, a five-membered ring with the formula C4H4BiH. It is classified as a metallole. It can be viewed as a structural analog of pyrrole, with bismuth replacing the nitrogen atom of pyrrole. The unsubstituted compound has not been isolated due to the high energy of the Bi-H bond. Substituted derivatives, which have been synthesized, are called bismoles.

Reactions
2,5-Bis(trimethylsilyl)-3,4-dimethyl-1-phenyl-1H-bismole, for example, can be formed by the reaction of (1Z,3Z)-1,4-bis(trimethylsilyl)-1,4-diiodobuta-2,3-dimethyl-1,3-diene and diiodophenylbismuthine. Bismoles can be used to form ferrocene-like sandwich compounds.

See also
Organobismuth chemistry

References

Bismuth heterocycles
Metalloles
Hypothetical chemical compounds